Goodwin House may mean:
 Goodwin House (Ottawa), Ontario
Goodwin House (Brookhaven, Georgia), adjacent to Atlanta
Goodwin House, oldest building in Suwanee, Georgia